Lucius Annius Arrianus was a Roman senator who was appointed consul in AD 243.

References

Imperial Roman consuls
3rd-century Romans
Annii
Year of birth unknown
Year of death unknown
Date of birth unknown
Date of death unknown
Place of birth unknown
Place of death unknown